Hello Baby is a 1976 Swedish drama film directed by Johan Bergenstråhle. Toivo Pawlo won the award for Best Actor at the 12th Guldbagge Awards.

Cast
 Marie-Louise De Geer Bergenstråhle as The Girl
 Anders Ek as Anders Ek
 Siv Ericks as The Girl's Mother
 Malin Gjörup as The Girl as child
 Manne Grünberger as Rabbi
 Nina Gunke as Leading Part
 Gerd Hagman as Journalist
 Keve Hjelm as Director
 Jan Molander as Director
 Toivo Pawlo as The Girl's Father
 Ulla Sallert as Actress
 Håkan Serner as The Girl's Ex-man
 Maria Lindberg as Sad girl (uncredited)

References

External links
 
 

1976 films
1976 drama films
Swedish drama films
1970s Swedish-language films
Films directed by Johan Bergenstråhle
1970s Swedish films